José Tamayo (1920–2003) was a Spanish theatre director and producer, best known for his dramatic and zarzuela plays, epitomized by Antología de la Zarzuela (Zarzuela anthology).

Spanish theatre directors
20th-century Spanish businesspeople
People from Granada
1920 births
2003 deaths